library Extension service may refer to:
 Cooperative State Research, Education, and Extension Service (CSREES), a USDA office
 Agricultural extension services, educational services offered to farmers and other growers 
 Church extension service, one church that meets at multiple locations
 MUN Extension Service, a community development program of Memorial University of Newfoundland operating from 1959-1991